Kurama may refer to:

Japan 
 Mount Kurama, a mountain in Japan frequently referenced in martial arts
 Kurama-dera, a temple
 Japanese armored cruiser Kurama, an Ibuki class armored cruiser (later battlecruiser) named after Mount Kurama
 JDS Kurama (DDH-144), a Shirane-class destroyer
 Kurama Tatsuya (1952–1995), sumo wrestler

Fictional characters
 Kurama (Naruto), a character in Naruto media
Kurama clan members, Naruto anime only arc
 Kurama (Urusei Yatsura), a character in Urusei Yatsura media
 Kurama (YuYu Hakusho), a character in YuYu Hakusho media
 Kurama, a character in Elfen Lied media

Other uses 
 Kurama Range, mountains near Angren, Uzbekistan
 Kurama (moth), a genus of moths of the family Drepanidae
 Kurama language, a Niger-Congo language

See also 
 Kurrama people, an Indigenous Australian people
 Kurrama language, an Australian Aboriginal language